Subaru Motorsports USA (formerly known as Subaru Rally Team USA) is  Subaru of America's motorsports arm that participates in events in the United States and its operations are managed by Vermont SportsCar, previously Prodrive.

History
The team was started in 2000 with cars prepared by Prodrive and raced in the SCCA ProRally championship and continued until 2004. In 2006, the team management was handed over to Vermont SportsCar.

Since 2001 Vermont SportsCar has had a relationship with Subaru of America who has served as both a sponsor and partner. Subaru utilizes the sport of rallying to promote their line-up of all-wheel drive vehicles, specifically the Subaru Impreza WRX STI which has dominated rallying in both the US and internationally for decades.

Starting in 2006 Vermont SportsCar began managing the operations of Subaru Rally Team USA. In their first year Vermont SportsCar took Subaru Rally Team USA to four straight Rally America National Championship driver's titles with driver Travis Pastrana (2006-2009).

In 2010 the team welcomed Dave Mirra to a full-time role as the team's 2nd driver alongside Pastrana, who was participating in a limited schedule of events. In 2011 Pastrana left the team to pursue NASCAR and was replaced by multi-time British and American rally champion David Higgins. Alongside his co-driver Craig Drew, David drove his WRX STI to 8 National Championships in a 9-year span, including a Perfect Season in 2015. Pastrana made a return to the team in 2014 and continues to be their main driver for stage rally competition with the American Rally Association.

The team utilizes the Subaru WRX STI and rally prepares the cars nearly entirely in-house at Vermont SportsCar, including the shell prep, roll cages, engines and many of the composite parts. The same highly skilled rally technicians that build each of team's cars at Vermont SportsCar also serve as the service crew that travel to each event.

Although they primarily compete in the American Rally Association National Championship and Americas Rallycross Championship (ARX), the team also competes occasionally in the Canadian Rally Championship, the X Games and the World Rally Championship.

In 2019, the team changed its name to Subaru Motorsports USA along with a revision to the structure of its U.S. racing activities, which now combines stage rally, rallycross, record attempts, off-road racing, and circuit racing under the banner of Subaru Motorsports. Subaru Motorsports USA has been a seminal force in the rise in popularity of rallying in North America.

Rally

Subaru Rally Team USA participated in Rally America events, Canadian Rally Championship events, and previously participated in the World Rally Championship for a short time. Since taking on the American rally stages they have amassed 13 National Championships (5 with Pastrana, 8 with Higgins). Occasionally, the team has made entries in WRC with Ramana Lagemann at Rally New Zealand in 2003 and David Higgins at Rally GB in 2015. Stage Rally competition with the American Rally Association continues to be a staple of the teams focus.

Rallycross

The team participated in the Global RallyCross Championship and X-Games events until they were replaced by the Americas Rallycross Championship in 2018. In 2006 and 2007, Colin McRae participated in X-Games with the team. He rolled the car due to an awkwardly landed jump, but still managed to finish in second place, right behind Travis Pastrana.

On May 4, 2012, Subaru announced their partnership with Puma and their new rallycross team, Subaru Puma Rallycross Team USA. The three-driver team consisted of Dave Mirra, Bucky Lasek, and Sverre Isachsen. On September 11, 2013, SRT USA contracted their Global Rallycross effort to two cars, releasing Dave Mirra. The team eventually made a shift in their lineup switching out Lasek and Isachsen with global rallycross star Patrik Sandell and former Subaru World Rally Team driver Chris Atkinson before the Global RallyCross Championship ended in 2017.

In 2018 IMG founded the Americas Rallycross Championship which effectively replaced GRC. Sandell and Atkinson continued with the team during the transition and added Scott Speed to the roster the following year. Despite countless podiums, overall wins, and a championship within grasp, ARX wrapped up after just two seasons with no further rallycross programs in sight.

Championship wins

Video games
SRT USA heavily appeared in the racing game Colin McRae: DiRT 2 with 2008 drivers Ken Block, Travis Pastrana, and Dave Mirra. The #199 and #40 SRT USA cars also appeared in DiRT 3 Ramana Lagemann's SCCA ProRally #4 rally car appears on the cover Colin McRae Rally 2005. SRT USA cars also are included in RalliSport Challenge, RalliSport Challenge 2, Colin McRae Rally 04, Project Gotham Racing, V-Rally 3, and Sega Rally Revo. In 2016 both Travis Pastrana and David Higgins appeared in Forza Horizon 3, as DLC.

Racing record

Complete Global Rallycross Championship results
(key)

AWD

Supercar

Complete Nitro Rallycross results

Supercar

References

External links

Subaru Motorsports USA
Vermont SportsCar
Global RallyCross Championship teams
2001 establishments in the United States
Auto racing teams established in 2001
World Rallycross Championship teams
World Rally Championship teams